Midhatana Palli is a village in Nalgonda district in Telangana, India. It falls under Atmakur mandal.

References

Villages in Nalgonda district